is a Japanese politician of the Liberal Democratic Party, a member of the House of Councillors in the Diet (national legislature) affiliated to the revisionist lobby Nippon Kaigi.

A native of Mito, Ibaraki and graduate of Ritsumeikan University, Okada had served in the assembly of Ibaraki Prefecture since 1986 and as mayor of Mito for three terms since 1993. In 2003 he was elected to the House of Councillors for the first time. He also held the following political positions:
State Minister of Cabinet Office
State Minister for Reconstruction
Parliamentary Vice-Minister of Health, Labour and Welfare
Chief Director, Committee on Financial Affairs, HC
Chairperson, Committee on Cabinet, HC
Director, Cabinet Division, LDP

References 
 
 Profile on LDP website: jimin.jp/english/profile/members/114741.html

External links 
  in Japanese.

Ritsumeikan University alumni
Members of the House of Councillors (Japan)
Living people
1947 births
Members of Nippon Kaigi
Liberal Democratic Party (Japan) politicians